Kaspar Deutschenbaur was the mayor of Augsburg, Germany, between 1919 and 1929. He was a member of the Bavarian People's Party.

Bavarian People's Party politicians
Mayors of Augsburg
Year of death missing
Year of birth missing